6-Bromotryptamine is a substituted tryptamine that is a marine natural product.

See also 
5,6-Dibromotryptamine
5,6-Dibromo-N-methyltryptamine
5-Bromo-DMT

References 

Tryptamine alkaloids
Bromoarenes